Larkhall is a town in South Lanarkshire, Scotland.

Larkhall may also refer to: 
 Larkhall, Bath, a district of Bath, Somerset, England
 Larkhall (Lambeth ward), a ward in the London Borough of Lambeth, England
 Larkhall (South Lanarkshire ward), a ward in South Lanarkshire, Scotland
 Larkhall railway station, South Lanarkshire, Scotland